The Corn Field Raids of 1827-1828 was a frontier conflict in the early Moreton Bay Penal Settlement. The conflict consisted of Aboriginal groups  plundering and destruction of the maize fields in South Bank and Kangaroo Point. Potential motives for the raiders include the lack of the distinction between cultivated crops and available natural resources to the native inhabitants, the taking of the crop as partial compensation for the continuing occupation of the settlers and as a warning to prevent further expansion beyond the colony's current bounds.

Notes

Australian frontier wars
Wars involving the United Kingdom
Conflicts in 1827
Conflicts in 1828
History of Brisbane